Potrerillos Dam is located on the Mendoza River, in Argentina's Potrerillos Valley. The dam was built between 1999 and 2003 by a consortium consisting of Industrias Metalúrgicas Pescarmona (IMPSA) and Cartellone to provide flood control, hydroelectricity and irrigation water. The dam cost US$ 312 million to construct.

The dam and reservoir have lost significant storage capacity due to the high silt content of the Mendoza River. The reduction in capacity has threatened the flood control capability of the dam, with the concern that the emergency spillway may become inadequate to pass high flood flows as the reservoir loses its capability to retain them.

Power plants
The water then flows through a second tunnel to power three Francis turbines at Álvarez Condarco with a  capacity. The entire hydroelectric complex generates upwards of 850 million kilowatt hours per year, or 20% of the electrical consumption in Mendoza Province.

Accidents
In December 2015, A helicopter which was being used for filming an MTV reality show The Challenge has crashed into the reservoir killing the pilot and a technician.

See also

List of power stations in Argentina

References

Works cited

Dams in Argentina
Dams completed in 2003
Concrete-face rock-fill dams